Hansuli Banker Upakatha may refer to:
 Hansuli Banker Upakatha (novel), a 1951 novel by Tarasankar Bandyopadhyay
 Hansuli Banker Upakatha (film), a 1962 film by Tapan Sinha based on the novel